Live in Verona may refer to:
 Live in Verona (Jamiroquai album)
 Live in Verona (Deep Purple album)